SENIAT (Servicio Nacional Integrado de Administración Aduanera y Tributaria–- National Integrated Service for the Administration of Customs Duties and Taxes) is Venezuela's revenue service.

External links

  www.seniat.gob.ve

Revenue services
Government agencies of Venezuela
Taxation in Venezuela